I Was an Ugly Girl (German: Ich war ein häßliches Mädchen) is a 1955 West German romantic comedy film directed by Wolfgang Liebeneiner and starring Sonja Ziemann, Dieter Borsche and Karlheinz Böhm. It is based on the 1937 novel of the same title by Annemarie Selinko. It was shot at the Spandau Studios in West Berlin. The film's sets were designed by the art directors Mathias Matthies and Ellen Schmidt.

Cast
Sonja Ziemann as Anneliese Howald
Dieter Borsche as Claudio Pauls
Karlheinz Böhm as Thomas von Bley
Marianne Wischmann as Lilian Markowski
Erika Remberg as Inge Howald, Annelieses Schwester
Tatjana Sais as Tante Elsa
Olga Tschechowa as Luise Raymond
Maly Delschaft as Madame Lax
Bruno Fritz as Alexander Howald, Vater von Anneliese
Evelyn Künneke as Singer
Curt Lucas as Diener Franz
Myriam Lynn as Grace Morton
Wolfgang Neuss as Journalist Mopp
Peter Preses as Plumberger
Fritz Rémond Jr. as Verleger Bierbaum
Ingrid Schwarz as Erika, Verkäuferin
Alexa von Porembsky as Frau Howald

References

External links

1955 films
1955 romantic comedy films
German romantic comedy films
West German films
Films directed by Wolfgang Liebeneiner
Constantin Film films
Cine-Allianz films
Films based on Austrian novels
Films shot at Spandau Studios
German black-and-white films
1950s German films
1950s German-language films